This is a list of ONE Championship champions in each weight division of each sport.

Current champions

Men's championship history

Heavyweight World Championship 
Weight limit:

Light Heavyweight World Championship 
Weight limit:

Middleweight World Championship 
Weight limit:

Welterweight World Championship 
Weight limit:

Lightweight World Championship
Weight limit:

Featherweight World Championship 
Weight limit:

Bantamweight World Championship 
Weight limit:

Flyweight World Championship 
Weight limit: 

{| class="wikitable" width=100%
|align=left colspan="6" bgcolor="#D0F0C0"|Mixed Martial Arts (MMA)
|-
!width=1%|No.
!width=19%|Name
!width=15%|Event
!width=17%|Date
!width=8%|Reign
!width=40%|Defenses
|-
!1
| Adriano Moraes
|align=center |ONE: Rise of the Kingdom
|align=center |September 12, 2014
|align=center |
|
|-
!2
| Kairat Akhmetov 
|align=center |
|align=center |November 21, 2015
|align=center |
|
|-
! —
| Adriano Moraes
|align=center |ONE: Heroes of the World
|align=center |August 13, 2016
|align=center |—
|
|-
!3
| Adriano Moraes  
|align=center |ONE: Kings & Conquerors
|align=center |August 5, 2017
|align=center | (757 days)
|
|-
! —
| Geje Eustaquio
|align=center | ONE: Global Superheroes
|align=center |January 26, 2018
|align=center |—
|
|-
!4
| Geje Eustaquio
|align=center |ONE: Pinnacle of Power
|align=center |June 23, 2018
|align=center |
|
|-
!5
| Adriano Moraes  
|align=center |ONE: Hero's Ascent
|align=center |January 25, 2019
|align=center |(2067 days)
|
|-
!6
| Demetrious Johnson
|align=center |ONE on Prime Video 1
|align=center |August 27, 2022
|align=center |(incumbent)
|
|-
|align=left colspan="6" bgcolor="#ADD8E6"|Kickboxing
|-
!width=1%|No.
!width=19%|Name
!width=15%|Event
!width=17%|Date
!width=8%|Reign
!width=40%|Defenses
|-
!1
|
|align=center |
|align=center |May 10, 2019
|align=center |
|
|-
!2
| Ilias Ennahachi 
|align=center |ONE: Dreams of Gold
|align=center |August 
|align=center |
|
|-
! colspan=8 align=center |Ennahachi vacated the belt on January 3, 2023, due to his inability to make the flyweight limit of 135 pounds while hydrated.
|-
!3
| Superlek Kiatmuukao
|align=center |
|align=center |January 14, 2023 
|align=center |(incumbent)
|
|-
|align=left colspan="6" bgcolor="#FFFF99"|Muay Thai
|-
!width=1%|No.
!width=19%|Name
!width=15%|Event
!width=17%|Date
!width=8%|Reign
!width=40%|Defenses
|-
!1
| Sam-A Gaiyanghadao
|align=center |
|align=center |May 18, 2018
|align=center |
|
|-
!2
| Jonathan Haggerty 
|align=center |ONE: For Honor
|align=center |May 4, 2019
|align=center |
|
|-
!3
| 
|align=center |ONE: Dawn of Heroes
|align=center |August 2, 2019
|align=center |(incumbent)
|
|-
|align=left colspan="6" bgcolor="#FF7F7F"|Submission Grappling
|-
!width=1%|No.
!width=19%|Name
!width=15%|Event
!width=17%|Date
!width=8%|Reign
!width=40%|Defenses
|-
!1
| Mikey Musumeci 
|align=center |ONE on Prime Video 2
|align=center | October 1, 2022 
|align=center | (incumbent)
|
|}

 Strawweight World Championship Weight limit: Women's championship history
 Women's Strawweight World Championship Weight limit:  Women's Atomweight World Championship Weight limit: ''

Tournament Winners

Records

Most wins in title bouts

Most consecutive title defenses

Multi-division champions

Simultaneous two division champions

Champions by nationality
Fighters with multiple title reigns in a specific division will only be counted once. Interim champions who never became linear champions are only listed in parentheses.

See also
 List of current mixed martial arts champions
 List of Bellator MMA champions
 List of EliteXC champions
 List of Invicta FC champions
 List of Pride champions
 List of PFL champions
 List of Strikeforce champions
 List of UFC champions
 List of WEC champions
 Mixed martial arts weight classes

References

External links
 Current title holders at ONE's official website

ONE Champions, List Of